Health Mate–Cyclelive Team was a professional road bicycle racing women's team which participates in elite women's races.

Team roster

Major results
2018
Stage 2 Tour of Uppsala, Kathrin Schweinberger
Diamond Tour, Janine van der Meer

References

External links

UCI Women's Teams
Cycling teams based in Belgium
Cycling teams established in 2018